Trudi Schüpbach (born Zurich, Switzerland, February 3, 1950; full name Gertrud M. Schüpbach; published name Trudi Schüpbach) is a Swiss-American molecular biologist.  She is an Emeritus Professor of Molecular Biology at Princeton University, where her laboratory studies molecular and genetic mechanisms in fruit fly (Drosophila melanogaster) oogenesis.

Research 
Schüpbach's research focuses on signaling pathways that are involved in pattern formation during embryonic development. Using the fruit fly (Drosophila melanogaster) as a model system, she revealed molecular mechanisms underlying the determination of the major axis of the embryo. Performing genetic screens, she identified mutants that result in female sterility of which many affect embryonic body patterning. By that, she contributed to the understanding of maternal factors that are deposited into the forming egg during oogenesis and that are conferred into spatial information within the developing embryo to demarcate distinct functional regions.

Life 
Schüpbach received her Ph.D. in Biology from the University of Zurich, Switzerland, where she also performed her first postdoctoral work before she continued as a postdoc at Princeton University. In 1990 she was appointed as Associate Professor and promoted to Full Professor in 1994 at Princeton University. Schüpbach is married to Nobel laureate and fellow biologist Eric F. Wieschaus.

Honors 

 1981 Alfred Schlafli Prize for thesis research awarded by Swiss Zoological Society
 1999 Elected Fellow, American Academy of Arts and Sciences
 2000 Elected Associate Member European Molecular Biology Organization
 2005 Elected to the National Academy of Sciences
 2006 Edwin F. Conklin Medal, Society for Developmental Biology
 2007 Elected Fellow, American Association for the Advancement of Science
 2011 Honorary Degree, University of Zurich, Switzerland

Trivia 
Genetic screenings for maternal effect "grandchildless" mutants resulted in the identification of a set of genes that are essential for the patterning of the egg and developing embryo. Many of the affected genes were named by Trudi Schüpbach after royal dynasties that extinguished due to the lack of offspring such as staufen, vasa, valois and tudor.

References

External links
Princeton University faculty profile
 Schüpbach lab page

Swiss biologists
Princeton University faculty
Members of the United States National Academy of Sciences
American geneticists
Living people
1950 births